Tourism in Eritrea made up 2% of Eritrea's economy up to 1997. After 1998, revenues from tourism fell to one quarter of 1997 levels. In 2006 it made up less than 1% of the country's GDP. The World Tourism Organization calculated that the country's international tourism receipts in 2002 were just US$73 million. Sources from 2015 states that main tourist are the eritrean diaspora. There are also a few curious architects visiting the country. However, the Eritrean airline, Eritrean Airlines, has not been allowed to fly international flights due to security breaches as well as sanctions which has led international visitors to rely on airlines such as Ethiopian Airlines and Turkish Airlines to get to the country.

The government has started a twenty-year plan to develop the country's tourist industry. However, the development of tourism is hampered by drought, political totalitarianism, and war.

References 

 
Eritrea